The 2009 Hong Kong Games, officially known as The 2nd Hong Kong Games, was a major multi-sport event in Hong Kong. The games were staged between 9 May and 31 May 2009, with participation from 2307 athletes. The awards included 80 gold medals, 80 silver medals and 81 bronze medals. The ultimate tournament victor was the Yuen Long District.

Purpose
Expanding on the 2007 Hong Kong Games, the event aimed to popularize sports participation in the Hong Kong area. Also, with the staging of 2009 East Asian Games in December of the same year, the Hong Kong games acted as a precursor to this larger event.

Event
The 2009 Hong Kong Games included 6 separate events: athletics, basketball, badminton, swimming, table tennis and tennis. Swimming and tennis were featured for the first time in the Games.

Opening ceremony
The Opening Ceremony was held on 9 May in Tseung Kwan O Sports Ground.

Closing ceremony
The Closing Ceremony was held on 31 May in Kowloon Park Sports Ground.

Locations

Athletics
Tseung Kwan O Sports Ground
Basketball
Chai Wan Sports Centre
Lung Sum Avenue Sports Centre
Shek Kip Mei Park Sports Centre
Tin Shui Sports Centre
Western Park Sports Centre
Badminton
Hong Kong Park Sports Centre
Lai Chi Kok Park Sports Centre
Queen Elizabeth Stadium
Tseung Kwan O Sports Centre
Tsing Yi Sports Centre
Swimming
Kowloon Park Swimming Pool
Table Tennis
Shun Lee Tsuen Sports Centre
Smithfield Sports Centre
Wai Tsuen Sports Centre
Yuen Wo Road Sports Centre
Tennis
Aberdeen Tennis and Squash Centre
Quarry Bay Park
Shek Kip Mei Park
Tai Po Sports Ground
Tsing Yi Park
Victoria Park

Competition winners

Overall Results
Overall Champion
Yuen Long District
Overall Runner-Up
Sha Tin District
Overall Second Runner-Up
Kowloon City District

Sports events
Athletics - Sha Tin District (champion), Kwai Tsing District (runner-up), North District (Second Runner-Up)
Badminton - Tuen Mun District (champion), Yuen Long District (runner-up), Kowloon City District (Second Runner-Up)
Basketball - Yuen Long District (champion), Central and Western District (runner-up), Tai Po District (Second Runner-Up)
Swimming - Eastern District
Table Tennis - Kowloon City District
Tennis - Yuen Long District

Cheering team competition
The Best Performance Award - Yuen Long District
The Best Local Characteristics Award - Wong Tai Sin District

Others
District with the Greatest Participation - Eastern District

Medal Tally

Source:

See also
 2011 Hong Kong Games

References

2009
Hong Kong Games
Hong Kong Games